A marginal seat or swing seat is a constituency held with a small majority in a legislative election, generally one conducted under a single-winner voting system. In Canada, they may be known as target ridings.  The opposite is a safe seat. The term ultra-marginal seat refers to a constituency with a majority of single or double digits, usually within a percentage of 2%.

Examples of traditionally marginal seats in the United Kingdom include Broxtowe, Watford, Bolton West and Thurrock. In Australia, marginal seats include Lindsay in New South Wales, Bass in Tasmania, Longman in Queensland and Corangamite in Victoria. Ultra-marginal seats in Australia include the federal seat of Gilmore in New South Wales and the state seats of Bundaberg in Queensland and Kogarah in New South Wales.

In the United States
In the United States, examples of congressional districts considered marginal in recent years include Illinois's 10th congressional district, located in the northern suburbs of Chicago, Texas's 23rd congressional district, covering most of Texas' border with Mexico, and New Hampshire's 1st congressional district, which includes much of the state's eastern half, including its most populous city Manchester. Within the past decade, these three districts are examples of ones that have frequently switched partisan control and seen close races.

However, political realignments and redistricting may cause traditionally marginal districts to become safe for one party or another. An example of the former is Indiana's 8th congressional district, which was nicknamed the "Bloody Eighth" for its history of ousting incumbents from both the Democratic and Republican parties. However, as rural white voters, who are a large percentage of the district's population, have become increasingly Republican, it is now considered a safely Republican seat. On the other hand, North Carolina's 11th congressional district is an example of a seat that lost its marginal status due to redistricting. It was formerly a highly competitive seat, albeit with a slight conservative lean, that often changed partisan hands. The Democratic base in the district was the city of Asheville, while Republicans were dominant in much of the city's suburbs, and the mountainous rural areas were evenly split between the two parties. However, the Republican-controlled North Carolina legislature redrew the district in 2012 to remove much of Asheville and add conservative territory from the adjacent 10th district, therefore making the district much more difficult to win for three-term incumbent Heath Shuler, a conservative Democrat. Indeed, Shuler opted to retire, and Republican Mark Meadows won the seat easily, subsequently holding it until March 2020 when he resigned to serve as White House Chief of Staff.

Conversely, seats that were formerly considered safe for one party may become swing seats. For instance, Orange County, California, was traditionally a Republican stronghold, and most of its congressional seats were solidly Republican for decades. However, demographic changes, particularly Democratic strength with Hispanic and Asian voters, have eroded Republican dominance of the county; Hillary Clinton won it in 2016, becoming the first Democratic presidential nominee to do so since Franklin D. Roosevelt in 1936, while Democrats, for the first time in many years, swept all of its congressional seats in the 2018 midterms.

Marginal seats only require a small swing to change hands and therefore are typically the focus of most campaign resources. The concentration of money and human resources in areas where they will make the most difference is known as targeting.

Strategies for securing marginal seats
The creation of policy that will benefit a particular seat, at the expense of other taxpayers, is known as pork barreling.

Political parties often face tension between the holders of marginal seats and safe seats. Safe seats tend to be allocated far less discretionary resources—governmental as well as political—from their political party than do marginal seats.

A similar phenomenon happens in United States presidential elections, where the Electoral College system means that candidates must win states rather than the popular vote. Again, resources are concentrated towards the swing states with the smallest majorities.

See also
 Bellwether
 Swing vote

References

Elections
Political science terminology